Derick Hall (born March 19, 2001) is an American football defensive end for the Auburn Tigers.

High School career
Hall attended Gulfport High School in Gulfport, Mississippi. Coming out of high school, he was a 4 star prospect, the 147th overall recruit and the 8th ranked weakside defensive end. He committed to play college football at Auburn University over Mississippi State and Ole Miss.

College career
Hall was primarily a rotational player as a freshman and sophomore, recording a total of 34 tackles and 3.5 sacks. Hall would become a starter as a junior, where he recorded 52 total tackles and nine sacks. He was named second-team All-SEC in 2021 and first-team All-SEC in 2022.

References

External links
Auburn Tigers bio

Living people
Players of American football from Mississippi
Auburn Tigers football players
People from Gulfport, Mississippi
American football defensive ends
2001 births